"The Ned-Liest Catch" is the twenty-second and final episode of the twenty-second season of the American animated television series The Simpsons. It originally aired on the Fox network in the United States on May 22, 2011. This is the second season finale to end on a cliffhanger, with the first being the first part of "Who Shot Mr. Burns?" from the sixth season. It is the third episode and the second one from season 22 (the other being "The Great Simpsina") to have no chalkboard gag, couch gag or opening credits on a television. It was also the first episode to cut from the clouds to the start of the episode itself.

The episode sees Edna Krabappel and Ned Flanders begin dating, their relationship being left to the public vote. It has been followed by "The Falcon and the D'ohman", which revealed that they are still together, and "Ned 'n Edna's Blend", which revealed that they have since married.

Plot
Edna Krabappel is suspended from teaching by Superintendent Chalmers with full pay after Bart pulls a prank that leads Edna to slap him twice on the back of the head. Chalmers orders Edna to report to a rubber room where teachers spend agonizing days waiting until their fates are decided. Bart feels guilty about his behavior and helps Edna escape detention. When she uses a ladder outside the window to leave the building, it collapses but Ned Flanders winds up catching and saving her.

Ned and Edna start dating, and Edna is thrilled when Chalmers lets her return to teaching as long as she also does some weekend work as a prison guard. Fed up with Homer and Bart's attitudes towards Edna and Ned's romance, Marge shames Homer into putting in some good words about Edna with Ned. Homer takes Ned to Moe's and when he sees that Ned truly does love Edna, he relents and praises their relationship. Unfortunately, the other barflies then make references to Edna's extensive dating history, and Ned is surprised that she has been with many of Springfield's men, including Aerosmith drummer Joey Kramer. Ned furiously accuses Homer of trying to ruin his relationship, and he runs away in horror from Edna and gives Homer the silent treatment until Homer makes some points that make Ned think. Ned then tells Edna he forgives her past, but Edna angrily tells him off by saying that she is not sorry about her past and does not want or need his approval – she only wants to date him again. She then tells him that, if they are going to stay together, her past must never get in their way. Ned says that the decision has to be left to a higher power.

The episode and the season ends on a cliffhanger with Homer and Marge giving a link to TheSimpsons.com and encouraging viewers to vote on whether Ned and Edna should stay together, with the results to be revealed at the end of the first episode of the 23rd season.

Production
On The Simpsons, when characters become couples, they usually break up at the end of the episodes. Executive producer Al Jean said in an interview that the writers decided it would not be interesting for them to do another episode where a relationship ended, and they thought it would be interesting "to see what people think, [...] the Internet certainly has a lot of opinion on the show, might as well have them have their say." When asked why the writers thought Ned and Edna were the right characters for a cliffhanger like this, Jean said that "In life, unusual things happen. People couple together in ways you would not expect, and he's single and she's single. We thought it would be funny, the fact that they both have these connections to the Simpsons, but they never really met or if they have met it was minimal."

The fate of the "Nedna" relationship being left to a public vote made this the second cliffhanger episode of The Simpsons. The cliffhanger was resolved the 23rd season premiere "The Falcon and the D'ohman" by revealing Ned and Edna were still a couple, as the real-world poll overwhelmingly voted to keep them together.

Reception
In its original American broadcast, "The Ned-Liest Catch" was viewed by an estimated 5.25 million households and received a 2.5 rating/7 share among adults between the ages of 18 and 49. The episode stayed even with the ratings from the previous episode, "500 Keys".

Reruns
Reruns feature an alternate version of the episode's credits, with Marge informing the audience that it is now too late to vote. Homer then insults the show's viewers, but Marge corrects him, saying there is plenty for the fans to check out on TheSimpsons.com, and advises them to watch the next episode in order to find out the results of the Ned and Edna relationship.

Following the October 2013 death of Marcia Wallace, Fox paid tribute to her with a re-broadcast of "The Ned-Liest Catch" preceding the premiere of "Four Regrettings and a Funeral"; the latter's chalkboard gag consisted of a single "We'll really miss you Mrs. K".

Sequel
"The Ned-Liest Catch" was shortly followed by "Ned 'n Edna's Blend" the twenty-first episode of the 23rd season.

Footnotes

References

External links

"The Ned-Liest Catch" at theSimpsons.com

The Simpsons (season 22) episodes
2011 American television episodes